Viola Sachs (20 September 1929 – 26 June 2020) was a Professor of American Literature at "Université de Paris VIII, France".

Works

As a specialist of Herman Melville, she conducted research and studies for the decoding of Melville's master works. She created the Laboratory of Research on American "Imaginaire" (SIAM) in the early eighties at the University of Paris VIII (Département Anglo-Américain). Today, SIAM's  research programs are continuing with the "Résonance Group" of the University of Paris VIII.

Her teachings brought also a new approach on: 
 the influences of the Bible in American Literature,
 the important role of fraternities and sororities in most of American master works.

Viola Sachs was also a specialist of Brazil, where she lived and studied after World War II. Ignacy Sachs, her husband published an autobiographical essay in which he narrates their trip from Poland to Brazil and India during the doom years of Nazism in Europe:

Bibliography

American Literature Studies

Brazilian works
Her Brazilian publications include:

See also
Paris 8 University
Herman Melville
Ignacy Sachs

External links
University of Paris VIII, France: Domaine Anglophone
The New York Times: Voyaging far and wide in search of Melville, Herbert Mitgang

Polish literary critics
Polish women literary critics
Polish academics
Academic staff of the University of Paris
2020 deaths
Polish women academics
1929 births